Ruth Louise Watson Henderson (born 23 November 1932) is a Canadian composer and pianist. She was the accompanist for the Festival Singers of Canada under Dr. Elmer Iseler for many years, where she developed her ear for composing mixed-choral works. Henderson also accompanied the Toronto Children's Chorus under Jean Ashworth Bartle from its inception in 1978 to 2007 and was music director for Kingsway-Lambton United Church in Toronto from 1996 to 2013.

An associate of the Canadian Music Centre, Watson Henderson's compositional output includes works for organ, piano, violin, trumpet, string orchestra, and more than 200 choral pieces. Her works are known for their use of modal and impressionistic harmonies. In 1989 her Chromatic Partita for Organ won a prize in an International Competition for Women Composers in Mannheim, Germany. In 1992 her Voices of Earth won the National Choral Award for Outstanding Choral Composition. In 1996 she received the Distinguished Service Award of the Ontario Choral Federation. Many of her works have been recorded and enjoy international popularity. Additionally, Canadian choirs often perform entire concerts of her compositions.

Life and career
Born Ruth Louise Watson in Toronto, Watson Henderson studied the piano with Viggo Kihl from 1937 to 1945. She then entered The Royal Conservatory of Music where she studied from 1945 to 1952 and earned an associates diploma in 1949 and a licentiate diploma in 1951. Her piano teacher there was Alberto Guerrero. She also studied composition privately with Oskar Morawetz, Samuel Dolin and Richard Johnston. From 1952 to 1954 she studied piano at the Mannes College of Music in New York City with Hans Neumann (pianist).

Watson Henderson made her professional concert debut in 1952 in Toronto and quickly became active as a solo concert pianist with symphony orchestras throughout Canada. She also played with some frequency on CBC Radio. In 1956 she won the grand prize on the CBC radio talent show Opportunity Knocks. After this, she moved to Manitoba where she lived in Winnipeg until 1961. After a few years in Kitchener, she returned to Toronto where she still resides.

While she was the accompanist for the Festival Singers of Canada she began to compose choral music, including her 'Missa Brevis.'  Later large works influenced by her experience in working with fine choirs include 'Voices of Earth' and  'From Darkness to Light.'  When she was the accompanist for the Toronto Children's Chorus, she wrote many compositions for children's voices, including Clear Sky and Thunder, a music-drama about Inuit children, which the TCC premiered in 1984 and 'The Last Straw' which featured tenor Ben Heppner in 1990.

References

1932 births
Living people
Canadian classical pianists
Canadian women pianists
Canadian composers
Canadian music educators
The New School alumni
The Royal Conservatory of Music alumni
Academic staff of The Royal Conservatory of Music
Canadian women composers
21st-century classical pianists
Women music educators
Women classical pianists
21st-century women pianists